Cyperus muniziae is a species of sedge that is native to parts of south eastern Brazil.

See also 
 List of Cyperus species

References 

muniziae
Plants described in 2007
Flora of Brazil